The Star was a London evening newspaper founded on 3 May 1788, originally under the title Star and Evening Advertiser, and was the first daily evening newspaper in the world. The paper ceased publication in 1831, when it was merged into The Albion. Founding sponsors of the new paper included publisher John Murray and William Lane of the Minerva Press.

References

External links 
 The Star at the British Newspaper Archive

Daily Mail and General Trust
London newspapers
Publications established in 1788
Publications disestablished in 1831
Defunct newspapers published in the United Kingdom